"Frankenfido" is an episode of the British comedy television series The Goodies.

As with other episodes in the series, this episode was written by members of The Goodies.

Plot
When Graeme gives Tim and Bill a special 'designer-dog' that they can enter the dog as a new breed in the Crufts Dog Show, they think that their dog is the only unusual dog there is.

Then they find that Graeme has been making all kinds of weird dogs for other people as well.

Some of Graeme's weird dogs, which he has bred for other people, include: a flying dog (a cross between a dog and a parrot) – a chair dog (a cross between a dog and a chair) – a stove dog (a cross between a dog and a stove) — and others.

One of Graeme's weirdest inventions is "Frankenfido", a six-legged monster, which is made out of a lot of 'spare parts' — the teeth being those of Donny Osmond.  Tim, horrified, says: "You're using people ... and Donny Osmond!"

Bill turns up dressed as a black and white dog called "Cuddly Scamp Hairylegs of Cricklewood", which proves to be a quick-thinking 'dog' or possibly cheating with false answers when tested on "Mastermind".

After their meeting, Cuddly Scamp and "Frankenfido" go off together.  Tim comments: "Who knows what he went through! All alone with that nasty great dog!"  Graeme comments: "Bitch!"  Tim, insulted, says: "Well!"  Graeme explains, saying: "Frankenfido was a bitch."  to which Tim responds with: "Oh I see."

Cuddly Scamp's meeting with "Frankenfido" has surprising results.

Cultural references
 Crufts
 Mastermind — of which Magnus Magnusson is the actual host
 Frankenstein's Monster

References

 "The Complete Goodies" — Robert Ross, B T Batsford, London, 2000
 "The Goodies Rule OK" — Robert Ross, Carlton Books Ltd, Sydney, 2006
 "From Fringe to Flying Circus — 'Celebrating a Unique Generation of Comedy 1960-1980'" — Roger Wilmut, Eyre Methuen Ltd, 1980
 "The Goodies Episode Summaries" — Brett Allender
 "The Goodies — Fact File" — Matthew K. Sharp

External links
 

The Goodies (series 5) episodes
1975 British television episodes